Renato César Pérez (born 16 August 1993) is a Uruguayan footballer who plays as a forward for Liga PRO Ecuador club Guayaquil City on loan from Primera División side Rentistas.

National
He has been capped by the Uruguay national under-20 football team.

U20 International goals

|- bgcolor=#DFE7FF
| 1. || 8 June 2012 || Estadio Parque Alfredo Víctor Viera, Montevideo, Uruguay ||  United States || 2–0 || 2–0 || Friendly match
|- bgcolor=#DFE7FF
| 2. || 5 September 2012 || Parque Federico Ómar Saroldi, Montevideo, Uruguay ||  || 1–0 || 2–0 || Friendly match
|- bgcolor=#DFE7FF
| 3. || 11 October 2012 || Estadio Luis Franzini, Montevideo, Uruguay ||  || 1–0 || 2–1 || Friendly match
|}

References

1993 births
Living people
Uruguayan footballers
Uruguayan expatriate footballers
Club Nacional de Football players
FC Lugano players
Club Deportivo Palestino footballers
Liverpool F.C. (Montevideo) players
Villa Española players
C.A. Rentistas players
Inter Playa del Carmen players
Uruguayan Primera División players
Uruguayan Segunda División players
Swiss Challenge League players
Chilean Primera División players
Association football forwards
Uruguayan expatriate sportspeople in Switzerland
Uruguayan expatriate sportspeople in Chile
Uruguayan expatriate sportspeople in Mexico
Expatriate footballers in Switzerland
Expatriate footballers in Chile
Expatriate footballers in Mexico